Segunda División B was the third tier of the Spanish football league system containing 102 teams divided into five groups, until it was replaced by the new structure in 2021. It was administered by the Royal Spanish Football Federation. It was below the top two professional leagues, the Primera División (also known as La Liga) and the Segunda División, and above the Tercera División. The Segunda División B included the reserve teams of a number of La Liga and Segunda División teams.

For the 2021–22 season, Segunda División B was replaced by Segunda División RFEF, which became the fourth tier due to the creation of a new, semi-professional third division by the Spanish federation (RFEF) called the Primera División RFEF.

History 
The term Segunda División B was first used in 1929. It was used to designate a third level of teams after the Primera División and a Segunda División A. This division featured 10 teams and at the end of the season Cultural Leonesa were crowned champions. However, the 1929–30 season saw the first of many reorganisations of the Spanish football league system and the original Segunda División B was replaced by the Tercera División. At the start of the 1977–78 season the Segunda División B was revived, replacing the Tercera División as the third level. Initially the division consisted of only two groups. The 1986–87 season was played as a single group of 22 teams. It was changed the next year, with 80 teams in four groups from the 1987–88 season.

The RFEF approved the expansion of the league initially to five groups of 20 teams each and recommended its further division into 10 subgroups of 10 teams each for ease of schedule, only for the 2020–21 season, due to promotion from the Tercera División groups in the curtailed 2019–20 season being applied. Also, the Segunda División B dropped down to the fourth level and changed its name to Segunda División RFEF on the creation of a new, two-group, 40-team third division called Primera División RFEF, which began to play in the 2021–22 season. An additional two teams were promoted after the 2020 Tercera División play-offs were called off and could not be replayed. In the 2020–21 season, the 102 qualified teams were divided into three groups of 20 and two groups of 21, subdivided into eight subgroups of 10 and two subgroups of 11.

Historical classification

Segunda División B currently features 100 teams divided into 5 groups of 20. The top four teams from each group, 16 teams in total, qualify for play-offs to determine which four teams will replace the four teams relegated from the Segunda División. However reserve teams are only eligible for promotion to the Segunda División if their senior team is in the Primera División. The top five teams from each group and best two teams regardless of group outside the previous twenty, excluding reserve teams, also qualify for the following seasons Copa del Rey. The bottom four teams in each league are relegated to the Tercera División. Also, the four 16th-placed teams enter into a relegation playoff to determine the two teams to be relegated. One team is paired with one of the others in home and away series. the two winners remain in the division while the losers are relegated. A reserve team can also be relegated if their senior team is relegated from the Segunda División. Along with teams from the Tercera División, teams from the division also compete in the Copa Federación.

Since the 2008–09 season, the four group winners had the opportunity to be promoted directly and be named the overall Segunda División B champion. The four group winners are drawn into a two-legged series where the two winners are promoted to the Segunda División and enter into the final for the Segunda División B championship. The two losing semifinalists enter the playoff round for the last two promotion spots.

Until 2019, the four group runners-up were drawn against one of the three fourth-placed teams outside their group while the four third-placed teams were also drawn against one another in a two-legged series. The six winners advanced with the two losing semifinalists to determine the four teams that will enter the last two-legged series for the last two promotion spots. In all the playoff series, the lower-ranked club played at home first. Whenever there was a tie in position (like the group winners in the semifinal round and final or the third-placed teams in the first round), a draw determined the club to play at home first.

In the 2019–20 season, the promotion playoff rules were altered by an RFEF resolution after that season was suspended and later curtailed during the coronavirus disease pandemic in Spain. Thus, the playoffs were contested differently at neutral venues. The four group runners-up were drawn against one of the three fourth-placed teams outside their group while the four third-placed teams were also drawn against one another in knockout matches. The six winners advanced with the two losing semifinalists to determine the four teams that entered the last single-match series for the two remaining promotion spots.

Promotions by year
Starting in 2008–09 season, the four group winners get a spot in the Group Winners Promotion Playoff. The two semifinal winners get promoted to Segunda División and play the final to decide the season champions.

Top scorers
Goals in playoffs are not counted.

Top goalkeepers

Records
Most seasons
36 – Barakaldo
36 – Cultural Leonesa
36 – Pontevedra
Most points
1,901 – Barakaldo (1.39 per game)
1,878 – Cultural Leonesa (1.38 per game)
1,773 – Melilla (1.38 per game)
Most games played
1,368 – Barakaldo (38 per season)
1,366 – Pontevedra (37.94 per season)
1,360 – Cultural Leonesa (37.78 per season)
Most wins
547 – Cultural Leonesa (40.22%)
546 – Barakaldo (39.91%)
526 – Pontevedra (38.50%)
Most draws
417 – Cultural Leonesa (30.66%)
413 – Barakaldo (30.19%)
406 – Melilla (31.67%)
Most losses
459 – Pontevedra (33.60%)
453 – Osasuna B (36.30%)
450 – Real Sociedad B (33.78%)
Most goals scored
1,719 – Cultural Leonesa (1.26 per game)
1,674 – Pontevedra (1.23 per game)
1,633 – Barakaldo (1.19 per game)
Most goals conceded
1,497 – Pontevedra (1.10 per game)
1,446 – Sporting Gijón B (1.23 per game)
1,434 – Real Sociedad B (1.08 per game)
Most group championships
5 – Levante
Most promotion play-offs played
11 – Barakaldo
Most promotions to Segunda División
5 – Barcelona B
Highest attendance
57,236 – Real Madrid B vs Conquense, at Santiago Bernabéu Stadium on 26 June 2005

Scorelines
Record win
 Extremadura 12–0 Racing Portuense (2 May 1993)
 Barcelona B 12–0 Eldense (1 April 2017)
Record away win
 Daimiel 0–8 Getafe (1 May 1988)
 Isla Cristina 0–8 Polideportivo Almería (7 February 1999)

See also
 Spanish football league system

References and notes

External links
Official website RFEF 
Soccerway - Segunda División B 

 
3
Sports leagues established in 1977
Sports leagues disestablished in 2021
1977 establishments in Spain
2021 disestablishments in Spain